The Western Illinois Leathernecks men's basketball team represents Western Illinois University of Macomb, Illinois, in National Collegiate Athletic Association (NCAA) Division I men's college basketball competition. The school's team currently competes in The Summit League.

Western Illinois' first men's basketball team was fielded in 1910–1911. The Leathernecks men's basketball program made the transition from Division II to Division I beginning in the 1981–82 season. They were selected to play in the College Basketball Invitational tournament following the 2011–12 regular season, the first Division I postseason appearance in school history. The Leathernecks were selected again to play in the College Basketball Invitational tournament after the 2012–13 season.

Coaching history
Stats updated as of the end of the 2020–21 season

Postseason

CBI results
The Leathernecks have appeared in two College Basketball Invitationals. Their combined record is 0–2.

The Basketball Classic results
The Leathernecks have appeared in The Basketball Classic one time. Their record is 0–1.

NCAA Division II Tournament results
The Leathernecks have appeared in three NCAA Division II Tournaments. Their combined record is 2–4.

References

External links

 
1910 establishments in Illinois
Basketball teams established in 1910